The River Ter SSSI is a stretch of the River Ter and its banks south of Great Leighs in Essex which has been designated a geological Site of Special Scientific Interest. It is a Geological Conservation Review site.

According to the Natural England citation:
This  reach  of  the  River  Ter  is  representative  of  a  lowland  stream  with  a  distinctive  floor  regime. In addition the site demonstrates characteristic  features  of  a  lowland  stream  including  pool-riffle sequences,  bank  erosion,  bedload transport and dimensional adjustments to flooding frequency.

Most of the river is inaccessible as it is surrounded by dense vegetation, but a footpath runs through an area of the north bank, east of the road called Cole Hill, which is within the SSSI.

References 

Sites of Special Scientific Interest in Essex
Geological Conservation Review sites